Bindslev is a small town in Vendsyssel, Northern Jutland, Denmark with a population of 1,031 (1. January 2022).

References

Cities and towns in the North Jutland Region
Vendsyssel